Haunted Collector is an American television reality series that aired on the Syfy cable television channel. The first season premiered on June 1, 2011,  and ended on July 6, 2011. The series features a team of paranormal investigators led by demonologist John Zaffis, who investigate alleged haunted locations with the hopes of identifying and removing any on-site artifacts or trigger objects that may be the source of the supposed paranormal or poltergeist activity.

The production of the second season started in December 2011 and premiered on June 6, 2012.

On September 17, 2012, Syfy announced that the series was renewed for 12-episode third season, which premiered on March 6, 2013.

On November 8, 2013, Syfy announced that it had cancelled Haunted Collector.

The series was rebroadcast under the name The Haunted Collector Files on Travel Channel in 2021.

Plot
Demonologist John Zaffis and his family investigate the sites of alleged paranormal occurrences. The Zaffis family and their team travel around the world to investigate items that Zaffis identifies as having something to do with spirits or energies. Zaffis removes the items from the location and takes them to his haunted relics museum in a barn on his property in Stratford, Connecticut.

Broadcast
The programme broadcast on Syfy in the United States and Really in the United Kingdom.

Summary
According to Zaffis, an artifact itself may either be of a paranormal nature such as a religious object once used in occult rituals or a non-paranormal nature such as an antique purchased at an estate sale or garage sale. Once an artifact is deemed to be a possible source of paranormal activity, it is removed from the premises in hopes that the activity in the location being investigated will be mitigated or cease altogether. The artifact is then housed in John Zaffis' paranormal artifact museum.

Cast and crew
 John Zaffis - team leader, owner of Zaffis Paranormal Museum in Stratford, Connecticut
 Chris Zaffis - paranormal investigator
 Aimee Zaffis - historical researcher
 Brian Cano - equipment technician
 Beth Ezzo - lead investigator/sensitive (Season 1)
 Jason Gates - paranormal investigator/historical researcher (Season 2 - Season 3)
 Jesslyn Brown - investigator (Season 2 - Season 3)

Episode structure
 Client tour: John and Aimee walk-through with the client through their home finding possible haunted items.
 Phase 1 - daytime sweep: Brian, Chris, and Jason set up the equipment and go through home doing EMF sweeps.
 Historical research: Aimee and Jason go to the local library to dig up any historical information on the location.
 Phase 2 - nighttime investigation: The whole team (minus Aimee) investigates entire location at night using night vision.
 Item research: John brings the item he believes is haunted to an expert depending on what type of item it is and finds out more information about it.
 Final client meeting: John tells the client about the findings on their investigation and asks if they would like the haunted item removed.
 Placing haunted item in paranormal museum: John removes the haunted item and stores it in his "paranormal museum".
 Client follow-up (not aired): A voice-over of John tells the viewers about how the client is doing without the haunted item in their possession after a few weeks or months.

Episodes

Season 1 (2011)

Season 2 (2012)

Season 3 (2013)

See also
 Ghost hunting
 List of reportedly haunted locations in the United States
 List of reportedly haunted locations in the world
 Paranormal television

References

External links

John Zaffis on Season Two of 'Haunted Collector'
John Zaffis Paranormal Museum

Haunted Collector TV Schedule SyFy TV Guide
John Zaffis 1st thoughts about John Zaffis ...
Haunted Collector’ John Zaffis Steals Valuables From Vulnerable People
Haunted Collector TV Muse
Haunted Collector Watch Series7
Haunted Collector U-Verese
Haunted Collector" Star John Zaffis
Haunted Collector Series
Syfy holds casting call for "Haunted Collector"
Haunted Collector returns Seasons 3

Syfy original programming
2010s American documentary television series
2011 American television series debuts
2013 American television series endings
Paranormal reality television series
Ghosts in television